LANSA Flight 502 was a Lockheed L-188A Electra operated by Líneas Aéreas Nacionales Sociedad Anónima (LANSA) which crashed shortly after takeoff from Quispiquilla Airport near Cusco, Peru, on August 9, 1970, after losing all power from one of its engines. The four-engine turboprop aircraft, registered OB-R-939, was bound from Cusco to Lima, carrying 8 crew and 92 passengers. All but one of the occupants died from injuries sustained from impact forces and post crash fire. Two people on the ground were also killed. There were 49 American high school exchange students on board, all of whom perished. A Peruvian government investigation concluded that the accident was caused by improper execution of engine-out procedures by the flight crew, aggravated by lack of maintenance and overloading. LANSA was fined and its operations were suspended for 90 days. At the time, the crash was the deadliest ever in Peruvian history before beingsurpassed by Faucett Perú Flight 251 in 1996.

Background 
More than half of the passengers belonged to a single group, sponsored by the Buffalo, New York, based International Fellowship student exchange program, consisting of 49 American high school exchange students, along with their teachers, family members, and guides, who were returning from a visit to nearby Machu Picchu to their host families in the Lima area. The daughter of the mayor of Lima was also accompanying the group. The Peruvian passengers included a couple on their honeymoon.

August 9, 1970 was a Sunday, and Flight 502 was originally scheduled to depart Cuzco at 8:30 am, but since many of the members of the American group wanted to visit the nearby Pisac native handicraft market prior to leaving for Lima, the airline postponed the departure time to 2:45 pm.

Higher mountainous terrain surrounds the single east-west runway airport in all directions. Since it was August, it was winter time in Peru, as in the rest of the southern hemisphere.

Crash 
At about 2:55 pm, the four-engine Electra turboprop began its takeoff run to the west. At some point during the takeoff run or initial climb, the number three engine failed and caught fire. The crew continued the takeoff and climb, per standard procedure, using power from the remaining three engines. The pilot radioed the control tower declaring an emergency, and the control tower cleared the flight for an immediate landing. The number three engine was engulfed in flames as the crew retracted the flaps and maneuvered the plane into a left turn back to the runway. The fuel on board caught fire and all aboard perished except the copilot, 26-year-old Juan Loo, who was found in the wreckage of the cockpit badly burned but alive. Two farm workers were killed on the ground.

Investigation

The Peruvian government investigated the accident, and in its final report concluded that the probable cause of the accident was the improper execution of engine-out procedures by the flight crew, with contributing factors of improper loading of the aircraft and improper maintenance procedures by company personnel. There was also evidence of a coverup and falsification of critical maintenance records by LANSA employees during the investigation process. The Peruvian government subsequently fined LANSA and some of its employees, and suspended the airline's operating license for 90 days as a consequence. Approximately a year after the suspension ended, the airline lost its last working aircraft with the crash of LANSA Flight 508, and ceased operations.

Aftermath
About a year after the accident, a monument—a large white cross with an attached nameplate—was erected on the spot of the crash site to commemorate the victims of LANSA flight 502.

See also

LANSA Flight 501
LANSA Flight 508
List of accidents and incidents involving commercial aircraft

References

External links
Cusco Airport Satellite Photo

archive.org record of accident web site
Hi-res image of the crash monument as it appeared in January 2017

Airliner accidents and incidents caused by pilot error
Aviation accidents and incidents in Peru
Aviation accidents and incidents in 1970
Accidents and incidents involving the Lockheed L-188 Electra
502
August 1970 events in South America
Airliner accidents and incidents caused by engine failure
1970 in Peru
Airliner accidents and incidents caused by maintenance errors
1970 disasters in Peru